The 1889 Pittsburgh Alleghenys season was the 8th season of the Pittsburgh Alleghenys franchise and their 3rd in the National League. The Alleghenys finished fifth in the league standings with a record of 61–71.

Regular season

Season standings

Record vs. opponents

Opening Day lineup

Roster

Player stats

Batting

Starters by position 
Note: Pos = Position; G = Games played; AB = At bats; H = Hits; Avg. = Batting average; HR = Home runs; RBI = Runs batted in

Other batters 
Note: G = Games played; AB = At bats; H = Hits; Avg. = Batting average; HR = Home runs; RBI = Runs batted in

Pitching

Starting pitchers 
Note: G = Games pitched; IP = Innings pitched; W = Wins; L = Losses; ERA = Earned run average; SO = Strikeouts

Other pitchers 
Note: G = Games pitched; IP = Innings pitched; W = Wins; L = Losses; ERA = Earned run average; SO = Strikeouts

References 
 1889 Pittsburgh Alleghenys team page at Baseball Reference
 1889 Pittsburgh Alleghenys Page at Baseball Almanac

Pittsburgh Pirates seasons
Pittsburgh Alleghenys season
Pittsburg Pir